The Botanischer Garten Adorf is a botanical garden located at Waldbadstraße 7, Adorf, Saxony, Germany, created in 1997-1999 as an adjunct to the Klein-Vogtland miniatures park. It is open daily in the warmer months, and contains over 11,000 plants from high mountains around the world. In 2008, a small fire destroyed 300 plants and a part of the attached miniature park. By 2009, all damages had been repaired.

See also 
 List of botanical gardens in Germany

External links 
 Botanischer Garten Adorf
 Description in English
 History in English
 Kunst-und-Kultur entry
 Garden photographs

Adorf, Botanischer Garten
Adorf, Botanischer Garten